FitzJohn was a bus manufacturer in Muskegon, Michigan. The company was founded October 8, 1919, by Harry Alphonse FitzJohn, and built over 5,000 bus bodies, complete buses, stretchout sedans and passenger-carrying trailers before closing down in May 1958.

History 

The FitzJohn company was formed in 1919 to build truck and bus bodies. The former were mostly for Ford chassis, while the latter were for REOs. Originally sold under the Fitz-Er marque, the buses were soon badged as FitzJohn. FitzJohn's best selling point was the low price relative to its quality, which led to enough success that a new plant was purchased in 1924, five times larger than the original. Sales continued to increase, doubling from 1924 to 1925, and in the late 1920s  FitzJohn was delivering almost 300 bodies a year. At that time FitzJohn models had a simple letter designation, although some had rather basic names, too. However, since so many options (such as rooftop luggage racks or polished aluminum bright-work) were offered, many of the variations were also given Indian names by the company's sales & marketing department.

From 1 January 1929, FitzJohn began selling directly to consumers, rather than exclusively through chassis manufacturers and dealers. This change, however, did not prevent  a 40% decline in sales due to the Depression, and on 8 June 1931, the company went into receivership. Its founder (H.A. FitzJohn) was forced out, and went into partnership with Paul O. Dittmar to produce the 12- to 15-passenger Dittmar-FitzJohn Autocoach (similar to the model D, but with a lowered aisle along the right side). H.A. FitzJohn later became the first manager of the General American Aerocoach Company.

In 1934 FitzJohn introduced its 11-passenger stretchout model 100. It was based on the Chevrolet Master Sedan which was split in the middle, had an extra body section inserted and a baggage rack added to the roof. The 100 was an immediate success, primarily as an economical "mini-coach" for feeder routes, although some were used for airport transfers or sightseeing services. During World War II, when many other bus manufacturers suspended production in favour of war materiel, the War Production Board directed FitzJohn to build a 15-passenger version of the 100. Otherwise-surplus Chevrolet, Pontiac and Packard sedans had extra rows of back-to-back seats installed, but because of wartime restrictions, white ash framing and Masonite panels were used instead of metal. Sixty-two enclosed auto haulers were also converted to passenger-carrying trailers in 1943.

Starting about 1940, under the direction of James J. St. Croix FitzJohn began to switch from building bodies for other manufacturers' chassis to their own integral models. The last bus body delivered was a model 625 in March 1940 for a White 1012 demonstrator chassis. In 1950 diesel power began to be offered as an option. At the same time the current models were redesigned with rear engines. Even though the Cityliner offered unparalleled maintenance access to the engine (the rear corner panels swung out, as well as the back panels lifted up), FitzJohn could not compete against the larger manufacturers (such as GM and Twin Coach) and decided to leave the transit market in 1954.

FitzJohn's last offering was the Roadrunner. Officially designated the FID (FitzJohn Interurban Diesel with a 150 hp Cummins JBS-600) or FIG (with a Gasoline Waukesha 176 hp 140-GK), the Roadrunner was offered as a 37-passenger coach with a  wheelbase, or a shortened 33-seat version on a  wheelbase. Only 14 FIGs were built, and all but a handful of the Roadrunners were 37-seaters. The last FitzJohns built for an American customer were five Roadrunner Sightseer variants (with roof windows) for Florida Greyhound Lines. The  Muskegon factory closed in May 1958, after the last order of 54 FIDs was delivered to Mexico.

Sales records exist for the 31 years 1927 through 1958. During that time FitzJohn constructed 2,621 buses  and coaches, 1,460 bodies, 776 stretchouts, and 62 trailer conversions. It is estimated that over 400 bus bodies—plus a small number of truck bodies—were built in the years 1921–1927, for a total of over 5,300 units.

Foreign operations 

In 1949 FitzJohn purchased surplus land and a  airplane hangar adjacent to the Brantford, Ontario airport. The first buses built by FitzJohn Coach of Canada Ltd. were delivered to Hollinger Bus Lines (a suburban Toronto company) in May 1950. The Brantford plant built 197 buses during 
its entire existence. Initially the front-engined 310 Cityliner was produced, but construction switched to the rear-engine FTD and FTG. In 1958 the facility was sold to Blue Bird, allowing that company to expand into Canada.

Shortly after World War II FitzJohn established a sales unit in Mexico City. Mexico proved to be a fertile market for the company, and 40-passenger Super Duraliners were sold there until 1956, many built to an unusual rear-entrance/exit configuration. Although sales dropped in the mid-1950s when the Mexican government began to encourage domestic manufacturing, over 50 Roadrunners were exported. Following the dissolution of FitzJohn, a Mexican company began building the Roadrunner.

Products

See also 
 Aerocoach

References

External links 

 Coachbult.com - Fitzjohn Body Company
 FitzJohn Buses
 Transportes del Pacifico 119: a Mexican-built Roadrunner

Defunct bus manufacturers of the United States
Defunct companies based in Michigan